Thout 9 - Coptic Calendar - Thout 11

The tenth day of the Coptic month of Thout, the first month of the Coptic year. On a common year, this day corresponds to September 7, of the Julian Calendar, and September 20, of the Gregorian Calendar. This day falls in the Coptic season of Akhet, the season of inundation.

Commemorations

Feasts 

 Coptic New Year Period

Saints 
 The martyrdom of Saint Youannes the Egyptian and his companions
 The martyrdom of Saint Matruna
 The martyrdom of Saint Basin and her three children

References 

Days of the Coptic calendar